Carsten Müller (born 3 October 1971) is a German football manager of Erzgebirge Aue and a former player.

Playing career
Born in Burg bei Magdeburg, East Germany Müller made nine appearances for the East Germany under-18 national team. From 1989 to 1994 he played as a defender for 1. FC Magdeburg in the DDR-Oberliga and lower leagues.

Managerial career
Beginning in 2007 Müller held various academy positions with 1. FC Magdeburg. He left the club in January 2015 to join FC Erzgebirge Aue as a youth coach. While serving as the head of the youth academy, he was named interim co-trainer of the first team in October 2021. He served alongside Marc Hensel who, at 35 years old, did not yet hold the required coaching badge. They were replaced on 23 February 2022. In September 2022, he was appointed as the interim manager of Erzgebirge Aue. The spell ended in December 2022.

References

External links

Living people
1971 births
German footballers
Association football defenders
German football managers
1. FC Magdeburg managers
FC Erzgebirge Aue managers
2. Bundesliga managers
3. Liga managers
People from Burg bei Magdeburg
Footballers from Saxony-Anhalt